Adolf Deucher (15 February 1831, in Wipkingen – 10 July 1912, in Bern) was a Swiss politician.

Early career
He studied medicine at Heidelberg, Zurich, Prague, and Vienna. In 1855 he became a member of the council of his canton (Thurgau), and in 1868 he served as a member of the council established to formulate a new democratic constitution for Thurgau. From 1869 to 1873 he was a member of the National Council of Switzerland, and, three years after his re-election to that body became its president (1882).

Later career
He was elected to the Swiss Federal Council on 10 April 1883 and died in office on 10 July 1912, aged 81. He was affiliated to the Free Democratic Party. During his office time he held the following departments:
Department of Justice and Police (1883)
Department of Posts and Railways (1884)
Department of Home Affairs (1885)
Political Department (1886)
Department of Trade and Agriculture (1887)
Department of Industry and Agriculture (1888–1895)
Department of Trade, Industry and Agriculture (1896)
Political Department (1897)
Department of Trade, Industry and Agriculture (1898–1902)
Political Department (1903)
Department of Trade, Industry and Agriculture (1904–1908)
Political Department (1909)
Department of Trade, Industry and Agriculture (1910–1912)

He was President of the Confederation four times in 1886, 1897, 1903 and 1909.

References

External links

1831 births
1912 deaths
Politicians from Zürich
Swiss Roman Catholics
Free Democratic Party of Switzerland politicians
Foreign ministers of Switzerland
Members of the Federal Council (Switzerland)
Members of the National Council (Switzerland)
Presidents of the National Council (Switzerland)
Thurgau politicians
Heidelberg University alumni
Charles University alumni
University of Vienna alumni
University of Zurich alumni